José Juan Santesteban (San Sebastián, 26 March 1809 – San Sebastián, 13 January 1884) was a Basque composer, father of José Antonio Santesteban. In 1844 — 1879 he was organist in Santa Maria, Donostia.

Works
 La Tapada, Spanish zarzuela
 22 masses 
 Método teórica-práctico de Canto llano
 Método elemental de solfeo

References

External links 
 José Juan Santesteban in Enciclopedia Auñamendi

Basque classical composers
1809 births
1884 deaths
19th-century composers